Tang Hongxia (born August 18, 1976) is a Paralympian athlete from China competing mainly in category F12‒F13 shot put events.

She competed in the 2008 Summer Paralympics in Beijing, China. There she won a gold medal in the women's F12‒F13 shot put event and finished sixth in the F12‒F13 discus throw.

In the 2016 Summer Paralympics in Rio Zhang Liangmin took a gold medal in the discus after a throw of 36.65 metres. Tang threw 35.01 metres to take the silver and Izabela Campos took the bronze with a throw of 32.60 metres.

References

External links
 

1976 births
Paralympic athletes of China
Athletes (track and field) at the 2008 Summer Paralympics
Medalists at the 2008 Summer Paralympics
Athletes (track and field) at the 2012 Summer Paralympics
Medalists at the 2012 Summer Paralympics
Paralympic gold medalists for China
Living people
Chinese female shot putters
Paralympic medalists in athletics (track and field)
Athletes (track and field) at the 2020 Summer Paralympics
21st-century Chinese women